Alexandre Kantorow (born 20 May 1997) is a French pianist. Described by Gramophone as a "fire-breathing virtuoso with a poetic charm" and by Fanfare as "Liszt reincarnated", he won the first prize, gold medal and Grand Prix at the 16th International Tchaikovsky Competition in 2019. With this win, Kantorow became the first French winner in the history of the competition.

Kantorow was born in Clermont-Ferrand to a family of musicians; his father is the violinist and conductor Jean-Jacques Kantorow and his mother is also a violinist. He began to study piano at the age of five at the conservatory of Pontoise. At the age of 11, Kantorow began studies with Pierre-Alain Volondat, who was the winner of the 1983 Queen Elisabeth Competition in Belgium, and continued training with Igor Lazko at the Schola Cantorum de Paris, as well as with Frank Braley and Haruko Ueda. When he was 16 years old, Kantorow was invited to play at the La Folle Journée festival in Nantes and has since appeared at such festivals as the Festival de La Roque-d'Anthéron, the Festival Chopin à Paris, and the Festival Piano aux Jacobins. At the age of 17, he performed at the Philharmonie de Paris with the Pasdeloup Orchestra at its inaugural season to an audience of about 2,500. He has since appeared at major concert halls including the Konzerthaus Berlin, Concertgebouw in Amsterdam, the BOZAR in Brussels, and the auditorium in the Louis Vuitton Foundation. Kantorow currently studies with Rena Shereshevskaya, who was also the teacher of Lucas Debargue, at the École Normale de Musique de Paris.

In 2019, Kantorow won the first prize, gold medal, and Grand Prix at the 16th International Tchaikovsky Competition, becoming the first French winner in the history of the competition. He was the only finalist in the competition to play the Tchaikovsky Piano Concerto No. 2 in G major, and also performed Brahms' Piano Concerto No. 2 in B-flat major.

Selected recordings 
 Camille Saint-Saëns, Complete Piano Concertos, Rhapsodie d’Auvergne, Africa, Allegro appassionato, Wedding Cake, Alexandre Kantorow, piano; Tapiola Sinfonietta; Jean-Jacques Kantorow, conductor; 2 SACD BIS (2019/2022). Diapason d'Or

References 

1997 births
Living people
Musicians from Clermont-Ferrand
21st-century French male classical pianists
Prize-winners of the International Tchaikovsky Competition